Cerhovice is a market town in Beroun District in the Central Bohemian Region of the Czech Republic. It has about 1,200 inhabitants.

Administrative parts
The village of Třenice is an administrative part of Cerhovice.

Geography
It lies on the border between the Hořovice Uplands and Křivoklát Highlands.

History
The first written mention of Cerhovice is in a deed of King Ottokar II of Bohemia from 1275. The village was promoted to a market town in 1516 by King Vladislaus II. The market town was a royal property until 1557, when it was purchased by the Lobkowicz family. Their properties were confiscated as a punishment for preparing an uprising against the king in 1595, and the royal chamber regained Cerhovice.

Transport
The D5 motorway from Prague to Plzeň leads south of the market town.

Cerhovice is located on a railway line leading from Beroun to Plzeň and Přeštice.

Sights
The landmark of Cerhovice is the Church of Saint Martin. It was originally a Gothic building from the first half of the 14th century. After the church was damaged by fire in 1728, it was rebuilt in the Baroque style in 1730.

There is a steel telecommunication tower on Třenická hora, which serves as an observation tower.

References

External links

Populated places in the Beroun District
Market towns in the Czech Republic